Saaleplatte is a former municipality in the Weimarer Land district of Thuringia, Germany. On 31 December 2019, it was merged into the town Bad Sulza.

References

Weimarer Land
Former municipalities in Thuringia